Jean Papire Masson  (1544 in Saint-Germain-Laval, Loire – 1611) was a French humanist historian, known also as a geographer, biographer, literary critic and jurist.

Life
Masson was initially a Jesuit, but left the Society. He studied law at Angers under François Baudouin around 1570. He became close to the circle of Catherine de' Medici, particularly to Carlo Boni, and became professor of law at Angers, where Boni was bishop. Later he was librarian to the Chevalier de Chiverny, was avocat to the Parlement of Paris, and married.

Works
He defended Antoine Matharel against François Hotman. He may in fact have written much of Matharel's Responsio (1575) to Hotman's monarchomach work Francogallia. The debate became a pamphlet war and slanging match.

The Latin life of John Calvin attributed to Masson had a reputation in its time as fair-minded.

Masson discovered a manuscript of Agobard in 1604, and edited it.

References 

1544 births
1611 deaths
French Renaissance humanists
16th-century French Jesuits
16th-century French historians
16th-century French writers
16th-century male writers
French librarians
French geographers
French biographers
French literary critics
16th-century French lawyers
French male non-fiction writers